Bessie Starkman (born Besha Starkman; June 21, 1890 – August 13, 1930) was an organized crime figure in Hamilton, Ontario, Canada, in the early 20th century. She and her common-law husband, Italian-born Rocco Perri, established a business in bootlegging after the sale and distribution of alcohol was prohibited in both Canada and the United States. Starkman dealt mainly with the finances of the business.

Early and family life
Bessie Starkman was born in Poland on June 21, 1890, to Jewish parents Shimon and Gello Starkman. Starkman immigrated to Canada circa 1900, settled in The Ward, Toronto, Ontario with her parents, and married Harry Toben by the age of 18. She had two daughters with Toben, Gertrude and Lilly.

In 1912, Starkman met Rocco Perri, an Italian immigrant, while he lived as a boarder in her family home. The two began an affair shortly after, and when Perri got a job working on the Welland Canal in 1913, Starkman left her family and moved in with him in St. Catharines to begin a common-law relationship.

When the Canadian government cut funding to the Welland Canal project due to World War I, Perri became unemployed. After working in a bakery, he was hired as a salesman for the Superior Macaroni Company. However, Perri and Starkman found a source of income when the Ontario Temperance Act came into effect on 16 September 1916, which restricted the sale and distribution of alcohol. The couple began bootlegging; using Starkman's business acumen and Perri's connections, they established a profitable enterprise. By this time the two lived in Hamilton, Ontario, and by 1920, moved into a larger home at 166 Bay Street South.

In 1918, Perri began an affair with Sarah Olive Routledge, with whom he had two daughters. After his first child was born, Perri had refused to marry Routledge, but he did maintain a home for her in St. Catharines and paid child support. Their affair resumed in 1920. Perri's job as a macaroni salesman required travel across Ontario; he also used those trips to arrange the sale of liquor. Starkman, busy running the finances for their organization, did not question Perri's outings. In February 1922, Routledge was falsely told by Perri's lawyer that he was already married to Starkman. Despondent, Routledge committed suicide by jumping from her lawyer's seventh-story office window of the Bank of Hamilton; her parents took custody of their children.

Criminal operations
Perri and Starkman survived financially in the few years after 1915 from his income as a macaroni salesman and their grocery store on Hess Street. After the Ontario Temperance Act was passed in 1916, making the sale of alcohol illegal, the couple started selling shots of Canadian whisky on the side. Their bootlegging was done on a small scale, with their kitchen as the centre of operations. Bootlegging became a much larger and more profitable enterprise when Prohibition was declared in Canada nationwide on April 1, 1918 and the Eighteenth Amendment that prohibited sale of alcohol in the United States in 1920.

Through the 1920s, Perri became the leading figure in organized crime in Southern Ontario and was under constant surveillance by police. The government allowed for numerous exceptions, allowing various breweries and distilleries to remain open for the export market. Starkman was the head of operations and the duo's negotiator and dealmaker. Perri diversified into gambling, extortion and prostitution. The couple were also reported to have taken part in drug trafficking as early as 1922, when the Royal Canadian Mounted Police (RCMP) suspected Perri of "dealing in narcotics on a large scale."

One report estimates that in the mid-1920s, Perri and Starkman were generating C$1 million per year through criminal endeavours and had a hundred employees. In that era, Perri was a "big spender" and the couple lived an opulent lifestyle. Nonetheless, Perri paid only $13.30 in income tax based on employment as a macaroni salesman and his "export/mailorder" business in 1926; Starkman, who claimed to be supporting him, paid $96.43. At about that time, some reports indicated that she had between $500,000 and one million in deposits at various banks. In that same year, Perri faced criminal charges in the death of seventeen people who died after drinking illegal liquor, but was acquitted of the charges.

In 1927, Perri was compelled to testify at the Royal Commission on Customs and Excise inquiry, focusing on bootlegging and smuggling, and also at a hearing on tax evasion charges against Gooderham and Worts. Later that year, at the Gooderham and Worts tax evasion hearing, Perri admitted buying whisky from the distiller from 1924 to 1927. Gooderham and Worts was convicted of tax evasion in 1928 and ordered to pay a fine of $439,744. Perri and Starkman were charged with perjury after their Royal Commission testimony, but in a plea bargain, the charges were dropped against Starkman; Perri served five months of a six-month sentence and was released on September 27, 1928.

Death
On August 13, 1930, Starkman was ambushed at around 11:15 p.m. as she got out of Perri's car in the garage of the couple's home. Perri ran down the street after the assailants before retreating back to Starkman who had been killed with two shotgun blasts. Police found two double-barreled shotguns and the getaway car without fingerprints. The investigation eventually resulted in no criminal charges being brought despite a $5,000 reward offered by Perri. However, it was thought that Calabrian compatriot Antonio Papalia, leader of the Papalia crime family and father of Johnny Papalia, played a role in the murder.

On August 17, about 20,000 people lined the street for the funeral cortege of hundreds of vehicles; Perri fainted at the gravesite. Starkman's headstone in Hamilton's Ohev Zedek Cemetery, commissioned by Perri, referred to her as "Bessie Starkman – Perri", but the "Perri" part was later removed by persons unknown. Part of Starkman's estate went to Perri, and the rest to her children.

In popular culture
 In July 2014, the first performance of a one-woman play, Bootlegger's Wife, about Starkman's life was staged at Theatre Aquarius in Hamilton. The creator and star was Victoria Murdoch; while the Perri character does not appear, "voiceovers" provide his comments. The play was staged again in mid-March 2019 and at intervals between those dates.
 Bessie Starkman appeared as a character on the CBC Television program Frankie Drake Mysteries in Season 2 (2018), portrayed by Natalie Brown, in an episode titled "Dealer's Choice". Another website states that the character runs an "illegal sports betting, and an underground casino" and is described as the "financial brains of the  gang".

Notes

References

1890 births
1930 deaths
20th-century Canadian criminals
19th-century Polish Jews
Canadian female criminals
Female organized crime figures
Bootleggers
Murdered Canadian gangsters
Depression-era gangsters
Prohibition-era gangsters
Polish emigrants to Canada
People from Hamilton, Ontario
Murdered Jewish American gangsters
20th-century Canadian women
20th-century American Jews
Deaths by firearm in Ontario
People murdered by Canadian organized crime